is a visual novel game developed by Kogado Studio's Shimarisu-san Team with the script writer being Sakusa Sakura. The series has an official abbreviated name of "ShiroKoi" using the first two kanji of the first two words of the whole title. The game is a visual novel about a girl named Kaori Sawai who was saved by hospital staff after an accident during her youth and decided to repay them by becoming a nurse at the age of 21. The story starts with Kaori starting her first day as a nurse at the hospital she would start working at and meet other people-some connected to her past. The first release of the game was in 2011 exclusively for the Sony PSP. In 2012, an expanded version of the original game was released titled Hakuisei Ren'ai Shōkōgun RE:Therapy for Microsoft Windows and PSP featuring an extended storyline for the original main characters, and new character route additions for previously minor characters Yasuko and Ami, as well as a remake-exclusive character, a middle-school girl aged Mayuki. On April 19, 2019, a new version of Hakuisei Ren'ai Shōkōgun RE:Therapy was released on Microsoft Windows, PlayStation Vita and Nintendo Switch in Japan with improved character sprites and event scenes. The Windows and PlayStation Vita versions were released in English and Chinese simultaneously as Nurse Love Syndrome, published by Degica. The Nintendo Switch version was released in English on December 26, 2019.

A new game in the same series, was released on PlayStation Vita on April 30, 2015, with a new cast of characters and art design. It was subsequently released for Microsoft Windows on December 25, 2015, and for Nintendo Switch on May 24, 2018.
Hakuisei Aijō Izonshō was in 2016 released in English and Chinese for Windows, and the following year on PlayStation Vita under the title Nurse Love Addiction, localizing the "White Robe" part of the series title to "Nurse", likely due to non-Japanese nurse uniform colors no longer being exclusively of white coloring.

References

External links

 

2011 video games
LGBT-related video games
LGBT themes in fiction
Medical video games
Nintendo Switch games
PlayStation Portable games
PlayStation Vita games
Video games developed in Japan
Video games set in Kanagawa Prefecture
Visual novels
Windows games
Yuri (genre) video games